David Walter Chomiak (born February 15, 1953) is a former politician in Manitoba, Canada. He served as a cabinet minister in the New Democratic Party government of Greg Selinger.

Chomiak was born in Winnipeg and grew up in East Kildonan, graduating from Miles Macdonell Collegiate; he lives in the West Kildonan area.  He worked as a lawyer before entering politics, and was a member of the Ukrainian Cultural and Educational Centre, the Canadian Shield Foundation and the Big Brother's Association of Manitoba.

Chomiak was first elected to the Legislative Assembly of Manitoba in the 1990 provincial election, in the north Winnipeg riding of Kildonan.  He defeated Progressive Conservative candidate David Langtry by 210 votes; Progressive Party leader Sidney Green finished fourth.  After the election, Chomiak joined with 19 other NDP MLAs as the official opposition to Gary Filmon's government.

Chomiak was re-elected in the 1995 election, defeating Tory Robert Praznik 5812 votes to 3624.  He again increased his margin of victory in the 1999 election, defeating PC candidate Shannon Martin by 6101 votes to 2542.  The NDP won this election, and Chomiak was appointed to cabinet as Minister of Health and Minister responsible for Sport.  He was relieved of responsibility for Sport on January 17, 2001.

In 2003, Chomiak supported Bill Blaikie's campaign to lead the federal New Democratic Party.

In 2003, he was re-elected in the once-marginal riding of Kildonan with over 70% of the vote.  On October 12, 2004, he was appointed as Manitoba's Minister of Energy, Science and Technology, with responsibility for the Gaming Control Act and the Manitoba Hydro Act. Chomiak had been the longest-serving health minister in Canada prior to this shuffle, and there were rumours that he requested a transfer to a less stressful portfolio.

In September 2006, Chomiak was appointed as Minister of Justice and Attorney General, and to the Manitoba Public Insurance and Manitoba Gaming Control Commission in Gary Doer's new cabinet.

Chomiak is anti-abortion, but as health minister never sought to criminalize abortions.  He was re-elected in the 2007 provincial election.

In the 2016 provincial election, he was defeated by Progressive Conservative candidate Nic Curry.

References

1953 births
Living people
Canadian people of Ukrainian descent
Members of the Executive Council of Manitoba
New Democratic Party of Manitoba MLAs
Politicians from Winnipeg
21st-century Canadian politicians